Rolf Schønheyder (24 June 1913 – 21 April 1994) was a Norwegian sprinter. He competed in the men's 400 metres at the 1936 Summer Olympics.

References

1913 births
1994 deaths
Athletes (track and field) at the 1936 Summer Olympics
Norwegian male sprinters
Olympic athletes of Norway
Place of birth missing